Margaret A. Moore Jeffus (born October 22, 1934) is a  Democratic member of the North Carolina House of Representatives representing the state's 59th district, including constituents in Guilford county. A retired educator from Greensboro, North Carolina, Jeffus is currently (2009-2010 session) serving in her ninth term in the state House.

Recent electoral history

2010

2008

2006

2004

2002

2000

References

|-

|-

|-

Living people
1934 births
People from Roanoke, Virginia
People from Greensboro, North Carolina
University of North Carolina at Greensboro alumni
Guilford College alumni
Educators from North Carolina
20th-century American politicians
21st-century American politicians
20th-century American women politicians
21st-century American women politicians
Women state legislators in North Carolina
Democratic Party members of the North Carolina House of Representatives